Thomas Blackstock (1882 – 8 April 1907) was a Scottish footballer who played as a defender. He was born in Kirkcaldy and played for the Dunniker Rangers, Manchester United, Blue Bell, Raith Rovers, Leith Athletic, and Cowdenbeath. On 8 April 1907, he died on the field while playing for Manchester United against St. Helens after sustaining a head injury and collapsing when heading the ball.

The grandson of Charlie Roberts has stated that it was Blackstock's death, and the lack of support for his family, which led Roberts and teammate Billy Meredith to form the Association of Football Players' and Trainers' Union.

See also
List of association footballers who died while playing

References

External links
MUFCInfo.com profile

1882 births
1907 deaths
Scottish footballers
Raith Rovers F.C. players
Manchester United F.C. players
Leith Athletic F.C. players
Cowdenbeath F.C. players
Association football players who died while playing
Association football defenders
Deaths from head injury
Sport deaths in England
Neurological disease deaths in England